M. V. Subbiah chettiar (born 1948/49) is an Indian industrialist, patriarch of the Murugappa family, and a former executive chairman of the Murugappa Group, known for his turnaround of EID Parry. In 2012, he was awarded India's third highest civilian honor, the Padma Bhushan. From 2008 till 2013 he was the Chairman of National Skill Development Corporation.
He studied engineering at the University of Birmingham for two years (but did not graduate) and got his Diploma in Industrial Administration from Aston University. He also studied at Harvard Business School. He was awarded an honorary DUniv by Birmingham University in 2011.

References

Recipients of the Padma Bhushan in trade and industry
Alumni of the University of Birmingham
Murugappa family